The Robertson Centre for Biostatistics is a specialised biostatistical research centre in Glasgow, Scotland.  It is part of the College of Medical, Veterinary and Life Sciences and the Institute of Health and Wellbeing at the University of Glasgow. All scales of research are carried out at the centre from multi-site clinical trials to small scale research projects. The centre also has interests in the development of novel informatics solutions for clinical research, statistical issues in epidemiology and health economic evaluation.

History
The centre led the WOSCOP study (New England Journal of Medicine 1995; 333:1301-7) which found that treatment with Pravastatin significantly reduced the risk of myocardial infarction and the risk of death from cardiovascular causes without adversely affecting the risk of death from noncardiovascular causes in men with moderate hypercholesterolaemia and no history of myocardial infarction.

The Robertson Centre joined with the Glasgow Clinical Research Facility and Greater Glasgow and Clyde NHS R&D division in November 2007 to create a UKCRN registered Clinical Trials Unit - the Glasgow Clinical Trials Unit.

References

External links
 Robertson Centre for Biostatistics website
 University of Glasgow website
 The Glasgow Clinical Research Facility website
 The WOSCOP study 

Statistical service organizations
Clinical trials
University of Glasgow
Biostatistics
Hillhead